Hutton Peter Gibson (August 26, 1918 – May 11, 2020) was an American writer on sedevacantism, a World War II veteran, the 1968 Jeopardy! grand champion and the father of 11 children, one of whom is the actor and director Mel Gibson.

Gibson was an outspoken critic both of the post-Vatican II Roman Catholic Church and of those Traditionalist Catholics who reject sedevacantism, such as the Society of Saint Pius X. In a 2003 interview, he engaged in Holocaust denial, wondering how the Nazis could have disposed of six million bodies during the Holocaust, and claimed that the September 11 attacks were perpetrated by remote control. He was also quoted as saying that the Second Vatican Council was "a Masonic plot backed by the Jews".

Early life and family
Gibson was born in Peekskill, New York, the son of businessman John Hutton Gibson (1884–1937) and Australian opera singer Eva Mylott (1875–1920). His maternal grandparents were Irish emigrants to Australia, while his father, who was from a wealthy tobacco-producing family from the American South, had Irish, English, Scottish, and Welsh ancestry. He was raised in Chicago. His mother died when he was two years old and his father died when he was nineteen. Gibson supported his younger brother, Alexis, who died in his early twenties. He graduated from high school early, at age 15, and ranked third in his class.

According to Wensley Clarkson's biography of Mel Gibson, Hutton Gibson studied for the priesthood in a Chicago seminary which was operated by the Society of the Divine Word but he left the seminary because he considered the modernist theological doctrines which were being taught there disgusting. However, in 2003, Gibson stated that he really left the seminary because he did not want to be sent to New Guinea or the Philippines as a missionary. Instead, he found work with Western Union and the Civilian Conservation Corps. He also contributed to and edited the newsletter "The Pointer" while he worked in Wisconsin for the CCC from 1938–39.

After serving with the United States Marine Corps at the Battle of Guadalcanal, Gibson married Irish-born Anne Patricia Reilly on May 1, 1944, at the Catholic parish church of Our Lady of Good Counsel in Brooklyn, New York. They had ten children and adopted another one after their arrival in Australia. As of 2003, Gibson had 48 grandchildren and 15 great-grandchildren. His wife died in December 1990. In January 2002, he married Teddy Joye Hicks, but in 2012 Gibson filed for divorce due to irreconcilable differences. From early 2006, he resided in Westmoreland County, Pennsylvania near Pittsburgh after moving from Australia to Houston, Texas, in 1999, and to Summersville, West Virginia, in 2003.

Railroad lawsuit and move to Australia
In the 1960s, Gibson worked for New York Central Railroad. In the early morning hours of December 11, 1964, he slipped off a steel platform which was covered in oil and snow and injured his back. A work injury lawsuit followed and finally reached court on February 7, 1968. Seven days later, Gibson was awarded $145,000 by the jury. Gibson paid his debts and attorney's fees and later that year, he relocated his family, first to Ireland, then to Australia.

Gibson said in 2003 that the move to his mother's native country was undertaken because he believed that the Australian Army would reject his oldest son for the Australian Vietnam War draft, unlike the American military. Because of his back injuries, Gibson sought retraining in a new career. He was encouraged to become a computer programmer after IQ testing placed him in the genius range.

Gibson was ousted as secretary of the Latin Mass Society of Australia after becoming increasingly vocal in expressing the allegation that the See of Peter is vacant due to Pope John XXIII, who convened the Second Vatican Council, and accusing subsequent popes of being heretical antipopes.

Quiz show contestant
In 1968, Gibson appeared on the Art Fleming-hosted version of the game show Jeopardy! as "Red Gibson, a railroad brakeman from South Ozone Park, New York". Gibson won $4,680 and retired undefeated after five shows, in accordance with the rules of the show then in force. He was invited back to appear in the 1968 Tournament of Champions, where he became the year's grand champion, winning slightly over one thousand dollars more, as well as a two-person cruise to the West Indies. Art Fleming observed on the October 18, 1968, episode that the Jeopardy! staff had had difficulty informing Gibson about his invitation as Gibson had decamped with his family to County Tipperary, Ireland.

Gibson later participated in many Australian quiz shows, including Big Nine with Athol Guy and Ford Superquiz with Bert Newton. In 1986, The Sydney Morning Herald reported that Gibson had recently won $100,000 and an automobile in a TV quiz program.

Beliefs
Gibson was an outspoken critic of the modern post-conciliar Catholic Church and a conspiracy theorist. He disseminated his views in a quarterly newsletter called The War is Now! and self-published three collections of these periodicals: Is the Pope Catholic?, The Enemy is Here!, and The Enemy is Still Here!

Gibson was especially critical of Pope John Paul II, whom he once described as "Garrulous Karolus the Koran-Kisser". His allegation that the Pope kissed the Quran is corroborated by a FIDES News Service report of June 1, 1999, which quotes the Chaldean Catholic Patriarch, Raphael I Bidawid, as having confirmed to the news service that he was personally present when John Paul II kissed the text, which is sacred to Muslims:

Gibson also used his newsletter to argue against Feeneyism. At the January 2004, We The People conference, Gibson advocated that the states should secede from the Federal government of the United States and the United States public debt should be abolished.

One week before Mel Gibson's The Passion of the Christ (2004) was released in American film theaters, Hutton Gibson told radio talk show host Steve Feuerstein that the Holocaust was fabricated and "mostly fictional". He said that the Jews had simply emigrated to other countries rather than having been killed, a view which observers described as Holocaust denial. He claimed that census statistics prove that there were more Jews in Europe after World War II than before. Gibson said that certain Jews advocate a global religion and one world government.

In his interview for The New York Times Magazine article, Gibson dismissed historical accounts that six million Jews were exterminated:

Gibson was further quoted as saying that the Second Vatican Council was "a Masonic plot backed by the Jews" and the September 11, 2001 attacks were perpetrated by remote control: "Hutton flatly rejected that Al Qaeda hijackers had anything to do with the attacks. 'Anybody can put out a passenger list,' he said".

In the early 1990s, Gibson and Tom Costello hosted a video called Catholics, Where Has Our Church Gone?. It is critical of the changes made within the Catholic Church by the Second Vatican Council and espouses the Siri thesis that in 1958, after the death of Pope Pius XII, the man originally elected pope was not Angelo Roncalli, but another cardinal, "probably Cardinal Siri of Genoa" (a staunch conservative candidate and first papabile). Gibson stated that the white smoke which emanated from a chimney in the Sistine Chapel to announce a new pope's election was done in error; black smoke signifying that the papacy was still vacant was quickly created and the public was not informed of the reason for the initial white smoke. A still photograph of a newspaper story about this event is shown. "Had our church gone up in smoke"? asked Gibson. He stated that the new pope was forced to resign under duress and two days later, the "modernist Roncalli" was elected pope and took the name "John XXIII". In 1962, Roncalli, as Pope John XXIII convened the Second Vatican Council. In 2006, Hutton Gibson reversed his position on the Siri thesis, asserting that this theory was based on a mistranslation of an article written on October 27, 1958, by Silvio Negro for the evening edition of the Milan-based Corriere della Sera.

A similar event happened in 1939; in that case a confusing mixture of white and black smoke emanated from the Sistine Chapel chimney. In a note to Vatican Radio, the secretary of the Papal conclave at the time, a monsignor named Santoro said that a new pope, Eugenio Pacelli, had been properly elected regardless of the color of the smoke. Pacelli took the name Pius XII.

Gibson endorsed Ron Paul for president in the 2008 United States presidential election. In January 2010, he made an appearance on the far-right-wing radio show, The Political Cesspool, to promote his views. In August 2010, he made another appearance on The Political Cesspool during which he made a widely discussed allegation that Pope Benedict XVI is "homosexual" and "half the people in the Vatican are queer". During the same interview, he also claimed that the Pope was a Freemason.

Local congregation support
In 2006, Gibson's foundation, The World Faith Foundation of California, which is funded by Mel Gibson, purchased an existing church structure in the Pittsburgh suburb of Unity, Pennsylvania, and used it to establish a Tridentine sedevacantist congregation called St. Michael the Archangel Roman Catholic Chapel. Rev. Leonard Bealko, purportedly a former Roman Catholic priest who had left the church voluntarily in 1986, was appointed pastor. By mid-2007, Gibson and his fellow congregants had dismissed Bealko and dissolved the congregation amid charges that Bealko had misrepresented his credentials and mishandled its finances.

Death
Gibson died at a medical center in Thousand Oaks, California  on May 11th, 2020, at the age of 101.

Books
 Is the Pope Catholic?: Paul VI's Legacy: Catholicism? (1978)
 Time Out of Mind (1983)
 The Enemy is Here! (1994)
 The Enemy is Still Here! (2003)

References

External links

 

1918 births
2020 deaths
American centenarians
American conspiracy theorists
American people of Australian descent
American people of English descent
American people of Irish descent
American people of Scottish descent
American people of Welsh descent
Civilian Conservation Corps people
Men centenarians
Writers from Chicago
Writers from New York (state)
People from Montclair, New Jersey
People from Peekskill, New York
People from Westmoreland County, Pennsylvania
Military personnel from New York (state)
American traditionalist Catholics
Traditionalist Catholic conspiracy theorists
Traditionalist Catholic writers
American Holocaust deniers
Jeopardy! contestants
Sedevacantists
Catholics from New York (state)
Catholics from Pennsylvania
Catholics from New Jersey
United States Marine Corps personnel of World War II
Hutton